Mircea Dobrescu (5 September 1930 – 6 August 2015) was a flyweight boxer from Romania. He competed at the 1952, 1956 and 1960 Olympics and won a silver medal in 1956, losing to Terence Spinks on points. He won two more silver medals at the European championships in 1955 and 1957.

Dobrescu took up boxing in 1948 and retired in 1982 after winning six national flyweight titles, the one from 1953 against his brother Constantin. He inherited glaucoma from his mother, which resulted in blindness during his last years.

1956 Olympic results

Below are Mircea Dobrescu's results from the flyweight division at the 1956 Olympic boxing tournament in Melbourne:

 Round of 16: defeated Federico Bonus (Philippines) on points
 Quarterfinal: defeated Ray Perez (USA) on points
 Semifinal: defeated John Caldwell (Ireland) on points
 Final: lost to Terence Spinks (Great Britain) on points (was awarded silver medal)

References

External links

1952 Romanian National Championships
1953 Romanian National Championships
1955 Romanian National Championships
1957 Romanian National Championships
1959 Romanian National Championships
1960 Romanian National Championships
1961 Romanian National Championships

1930 births
2015 deaths
Flyweight boxers
Boxers at the 1952 Summer Olympics
Boxers at the 1956 Summer Olympics
Boxers at the 1960 Summer Olympics
Olympic boxers of Romania
Olympic silver medalists for Romania
Olympic medalists in boxing
Romanian male boxers
Medalists at the 1956 Summer Olympics